Pádraig Delargy (born 1996) MLA is a Sinn Féin politician who is a Member of the Legislative Assembly from Foyle in Northern Ireland. Delargy became the MLA for Foyle following a selection convention held by Sinn Féin after his predecessor Karen Mullan was forced to step down following an internal review by the party.

Prior to becoming an MLA, Delargy was a teacher based in Derry. He went to Queen’s University for his undergraduate and Ulster University for his Postgraduate Certificate in Education.

References 

Living people
Northern Ireland MLAs 2017–2022
21st-century British politicians
Sinn Féin MLAs
Northern Ireland MLAs 2022–2027
1996 births